Rev. Peter William Cassey (1831–1917) was an African-American 19th-century school founder, deacon, minister, educator, abolitionist, and political activist. He was a pioneer in Santa Clara County. Cassey founded the first African American secondary school in the state of California, the Phoenixonian Institute. Cassey also worked as a prominent barber and had co-owned a shaving saloon in San Francisco; and worked as Methodist clergy in North Carolina and Florida.

Early life and family  
Peter William Cassey was born on October 13, 1831 in Philadelphia, Pennsylvania. His mother was an abolitionist, Amy Matilda (née Williams) from New York City; and his father was also abolitionist and a barber, Joseph Cassey (1789–1848) from the French West Indies. The family lived in the historic Cassey House in the Society Hill neighborhood. His maternal grandfather was Rev. Peter Williams Jr., and founding vicar of St. Philip’s Protestant Episcopal Church in New York City, the first African American Episcopal parish in the city, and a co-founder of the Phoenix Society.

Career 

In 1853, Cassey moved to San Francisco during the California Gold Rush. He worked as a barber, and in a partnership with Charles H. Mecier they opened a lucrative shaving saloon in the basement of the Union Hotel in Portsmouth Square at 642 Merchant Street, San Francisco. Around 1860, Cassey relocated to the San Jose area.

In 1861, he founded the first African-American secondary school in the state of California, the Phoenixonian Institute (also known as St. Philip’s Mission School for Negroes) a private boarding school in San Jose, California. Initially the Methodist Episcopal Diocese funded the school. He became active in the California State Convention of Colored Citizens starting in 1855, which later helped support the school financially and otherwise.

On April 26, 1863, he was the first person to be ordained on the West Coast at Trinity Episcopal Church in San Jose. In the 1870s, Rev. Cassey helped form two new Black Episcopalian churches in San Francisco; "Christ's Mission Church" (or Christ Mission Church), and he worked closely with the congregation from what later became St. Cyprian’s Church, however neither group had a building at that time. While Cassey worked in San Francisco, his wife Anna ran the Phoenixonian Institute school.

From either 1880 or 1881 until 1894, he worked as the first African American priest at St. Cyrian’s Church in New Bern, North Carolina. Later in life he served as the minister at St. Cyprian's Episcopal Church in St. Augustine, Florida.

He died on April 16, 1917 in St. Augustine, and is buried in the Evergreen Cemetery in that same city.

See also 
 Abolitionism in the United States
 American Anti-Slavery Society

References

External links 
 

1831 births
1917 deaths
African-American abolitionists
African-American Methodist clergy
People from San Jose, California
19th-century African-American educators
African-American activists
Clergy from Philadelphia
People from New Bern, North Carolina
People from St. Augustine, Florida
Colored Conventions people
African Americans in California
American hairdressers